The Lexicon of Live is a live album released by pop group ABC. Although Martin Fry was the only original member left, he had a backing band, and performed in his trademark gold suit.

Track listing (1999 Blatant BLATCD 01)
All songs written by ABC except where indicated.

"Poison Arrow" 3:56
"Stranger Things" 4:43
"When Smokey Sings" 4:20
"(How to Be a) Millionaire" 3:31
"Be Near Me" 4:38
"Who Can I Turn To?" 4:03
"Show Me" 3:35
"Skyscraping" 4:45
"Rolling Sevens" 4:46
"One Better World" 3:53
"Tears Are Not Enough" 4:00
"All of My Heart" 5:29
"The Look of Love" 4:00

Personnel

Martin Fry – lead vocals
Keith Lowndes – guitars
Mark Walker – keyboards
Steve Walters – bass guitar 
Ian Thompson – keyboards, saxophone
Velroy Bailey – drums
Beverley McLean, T.J. Davis & Darae – backing vocals

References

ABC (band) albums
1999 live albums